Norman Gerrard "Red, Norm" Armstrong (October 17, 1938 – July 23, 1974) was a Canadian professional ice hockey player who played seven games in the National Hockey League with the Toronto Maple Leafs during the 1962–63 season. The rest of his career, which lasted from 1960 to 1973, was mainly spent in the American Hockey League.

Playing career
Norm Armstrong played seven games in the NHL for the Toronto Maple Leafs. During those games, he scored one goal and added one assist for a total of two points. He also earned two penalty minutes.

He also played for the Rochester Americans of the American Hockey League.

He was inducted into the Rochester Americans Hall of Fame in 1986. He played for the Americans during 1962–71 and in 1972-73. He retired during training camp prior to the 1973-74 season. He is third in the Americans franchise for most games played at 566. Following his untimely death from a fall in a construction accident in 1974 at age 35 the Rochester Americans retired his number 6 jersey.

Career statistics

Regular season and playoffs

References

External links
 

1938 births
1974 deaths
Baltimore Clippers players
Canadian expatriate ice hockey players in the United States
Canadian ice hockey defencemen
Canadian ice hockey right wingers
Charlotte Checkers (EHL) players
Ice hockey people from Ontario
Ontario Hockey Association Senior A League (1890–1979) players
Philadelphia Ramblers players
Rochester Americans players
Sportspeople from Owen Sound
Sudbury Wolves (EPHL) players
Toronto Maple Leafs players
Tulsa Oilers (1964–1984) players